The Ashfall Fossil Beds of Antelope County in northeastern Nebraska are rare fossil sites of the type called lagerstätten that, due to extraordinary local conditions, capture an ecological "snapshot" in time of a range of well-preserved fossilized organisms. Ash from a Yellowstone hotspot eruption 10-12 million years ago created these fossilized bone beds. The ash depth was up to 1 foot.

The site is protected as Ashfall Fossil Beds State Historical Park, a  park that includes a visitor center with interpretive displays and working fossil preparation laboratory, and a protected ongoing excavation site, the Hubbard Rhino Barn, featuring fossil Teleoceras (native hippo-like ancestral rhinoceros) and ancestral horses.

The Ashfall Fossil Beds are especially famous for fossils of mammals from the middle Miocene geologic epoch. The Ashfall Fossil Beds are stratigraphically part of the Serravallian-age Ogallala Group.

Bruneau-Jarbidge event 

The Ashfall deposit preserves the fossilized remains of ancient animals that perished in a dense volcanic ash fall which occurred during the late Miocene, approximately 12 million years ago; the animals had come to a waterhole seeking relief. A large number of very well preserved fossil Teleoceras (extinct hippo-like relatives of rhinos), small three-toed and one-toed horses, camels, and birds have been excavated. Many animals were preserved with their bones articulated; one rhino still bears her unborn fetus, while others retain the contents of their last meal.

The bones of the animals show features that indicate that the animals died of lung failure induced by inhaling volcanic ash. The smaller animals with smaller lung capacity were the first to die, and the larger animals were the last. Bite-marks on some bones show that local predators (the carnivorous bone-crunching dog Aelurodon) scavenged some of the carcasses, but no predator remains have yet surfaced. There are also abundant clues to the region's ecology, indicating a savanna of grassland interspersed with trees that luxuriated in a warmer, milder climate than today's.

The rapidly accumulating ash, windblown into deep drifts at low places like the waterhole site, remained moderately soft. The ash preserved the animals in three dimensions; not even the delicate bones of birds or the carapaces of turtles were crushed. Above the layer of ash, a stratum of more erosion-resistant sandstone has acted as "caprock" to preserve the strata beneath.

Preservation 
The first hint of the site's richness was the skull of a juvenile rhinoceros noticed in 1971 eroding out of a gully at the edge of a cornfield. In 1971, University of Nebraska State Museum paleontologist Michael Voorhies was walking with his wife Jane through a series of gullies on Melvin Colson's farm in northeastern Nebraska and made this discovery. The Nebraska Game and Parks Foundation purchased the Ashfall site in 1986. Ashfall Fossil Beds State Historical Park opened in 1991. The site was declared a National Natural Landmark on May 9, 2006.

The park's Hubbard Rhino Barn opened in 2009. The  pavilion lets visitors observe as paleontologists carry out excavations of new discoveries exactly where the fossilized remains lie preserved. Specially constructed walkways afford visitors an unobstructed close-up view of paleontologists at work during the summer field season.

Species
The remains of Teleoceras are so numerous and concentrated that the main section of Ashfall is called the "Rhino Barn". Other fossils at the "Rhino Barn" include the remains of horses and camels. Taxa discovered in the Ashfall deposits include:

five horse genera: Cormohipparion, Protohippus, Pseudhipparion, Neohipparion and Pliohippus
three camelid genera: Procamelus, Aepycamelus and Protolabis
three canid genera: Leptocyon, Cynarctus and evidence of scavenging from a bone-crushing canid, possibly Epicyon
one rhinoceros genus: Teleoceras
one saber-toothed musk deer genus: Longirostromeryx
three bird species: Balearica exigua (a crowned crane), Apatosagittarius (a hawk resembling the living secretarybird), and Anchigyps (a scavenger related to Old World vultures)
three turtle species: Hesperotestudo (a large tortoise), Sternotherus (a musk turtle) and Chrysemys (a painted turtle)

See also
Gray Fossil Site
List of fossil sites
Pipe Creek Sinkhole

References

External links

Ashfall Fossil Beds State Historical Park Nebraska Game and Parks Commission
Ashfall Fossil Beds State Historical Park University of Nebraska State Museum
Ashfall Fossil Beds Skeleton Map University of Nebraska State Museum
Cenozoic Geology of Idaho: "The Bruneau-Jarbidge Eruptive Center, Southwestern Idaho" by Bill Bonnichsen  (pages 251-268) Idaho Bureau of Mines and Geology

State parks of Nebraska
Museums in Antelope County, Nebraska
Protected areas of Antelope County, Nebraska
Protected areas established in 1986
Fossil parks in the United States
National Natural Landmarks in Nebraska
Natural history museums in Nebraska
Paleontology in Nebraska
Miocene paleontological sites of North America
Lagerstätten
1991 establishments in Nebraska
1991 in paleontology
2006 in paleontology
Volcanic eruptions in the United States